Brachystephanus may refer to:
 Brachystephanus, a genus of plants in the family Acanthaceae
 Brachystephanus (mammal), a genus of notoungulates in the family Oldfieldthomasiidae
 Antepithecus brachystephanus, a species of notoungulates in the family Interatheriidae from the Eocene of South America

Taxonomy disambiguation pages